is a 1947 Japanese drama film directed by Kenji Mizoguchi. The film is based on a play by Hideo Nagata and portrays the life story of actress Sumako Matsui.

Cast
 Kinuyo Tanaka as Sumako Matsui
 Sō Yamamura as Hōgetsu Shimamura
 Kikue Mōri as Ichiko Shimamura
 Chieko Higashiyama as Seki
 Kyoko Asagiri as Haruko Shimamura
 Eijirō Tōno as Tsubouchi Shōyō
 Eitarō Ozawa as Kichizô Nakamura

References

External links
 

1947 films
Japanese black-and-white films
Films directed by Kenji Mizoguchi
Films set in the Taishō period
1940s Japanese-language films
Shochiku films
Japanese drama films
1947 drama films